Nagoya Stock Exchange (名古屋証券取引所 Nagoya Shōken Torihikijo, NSE) is a stock trading market in Nagoya, Japan. It is Japan's second largest exchange, behind the Tokyo Stock Exchange.

History 
The Nagoya Stock Exchange (NSE) is the successor to the Nagoya Stock Exchange Co. Ltd., which was founded in 1886. It was founded in 1949 as a corporation with securities companies as members under the terms of the Securities and Exchange Law. In 2002, Nagoya Stock Exchange, Inc. was established after demutualization of NSE. The Nagoya Stock Exchange is a stock corporation that provides an Exchange Securities Market under authorization of the Prime Minister.

It is operated by Nagoya Stock Exchange, Inc. (株式会社名古屋証券取引所) and has normal trading sessions from 09:00 to 15:30 on all days of the week except Saturdays, Sundays, and holidays declared by the Exchange in advance.

See also 
List of East Asian stock exchanges
List of stock exchanges

References

External links 
 Official Site

Buildings and structures in Nagoya
Economy of Nagoya
Stock exchanges in Japan
Financial services companies established in 1949
1949 establishments in Japan